The 1991 Volvo PGA Championship was the 37th edition of the Volvo PGA Championship, an annual professional golf tournament on the European Tour. It was held 24–27 May at the West Course of Wentworth Club in Virginia Water, Surrey, England, a suburb southwest of London.

The event was won by Seve Ballesteros, defeating Colin Montgomerie in a playoff. It was his second Volvo PGA Championship win.

Round summaries

First round 
Thursday, 24 May 1991

Second round 
Friday, 25 May 1991

Third round 
Saturday, 26 May 1991

Final round 
Sunday, 27 May 1991

Playoff 
The playoff took place on the par four 1st; Ballesteros hit a golf buggy with his drive, but hit a 5-iron to 3 feet with his second shot, setting up a birdie three. Montgomerie could only manage par.

References 

BMW PGA Championship
Golf tournaments in England
Volvo PGA Championship
Volvo PGA Championship
Volvo PGA Championship